is a Japanese politician of the Liberal Democratic Party, a member of the House of Representatives in the Diet (national legislature). A native of Matsudo City, Chiba he attended Waseda University as an undergraduate and received a master's degree from Meiji University. He was elected to the assembly of Chiba Prefecture in 1995 (serving for one term) and then to the House of Representatives for the first time in 1996. He was appointed by Shinzo Abe as Minister of Reconstruction on 2 October 2018 and left the position on 11 September 2019. He was succeeded by Kazunori Tanaka.

Remarks 

 Yoshitaka Sakurada is Watanabe's old friend. 
Yoshio Mochizuki is similar to Watanabe.

References

External links 
 Official website in Japanese.

1950 births
Living people
People from Matsudo
Waseda University alumni
Members of the House of Representatives (Japan)
Liberal Democratic Party (Japan) politicians
Politicians from Chiba Prefecture
21st-century Japanese politicians
20th-century Japanese politicians